Arpège is a 1927 perfume by Lanvin. It is considered to be one of the world's classic scents.

History
The fragrance has been referred to as the "fragrance of 1000 flowers" and its official name is a derivation of the musical term arpeggio. In fact, the perfume contains some 60 floral essences. Like Chanel No.5, launched six years earlier, it is considered an aldehydic floral perfume.

It was created by perfumers André Fraysse and Paul Vacher for Jeanne Lanvin and presented to her musician daughter Marie-Blanche on her 30th birthday.

The bottle design
The original black bottle with a gold top was decorated with a gold illustration of Jeanne Lanvin and her daughter, created by French fashion illustrator Iribe.

Reformulation
In 1993, the perfume was reformulated by Hubert Fraysse, brother of André and founder of fragrance manufacturer Synarome.

A special edition minaudière (evening bag) was launched in 2013 to mark the 85th birthday of the perfume.

See also
 Lanvin (clothing)
 Fragrance wheel

References

External links
 Official website
 Vogue tour of Lanvin offices

Perfumes
History of cosmetics
Products introduced in 1927
20th-century perfumes